If Youth But Knew is a 1926 British silent romance film directed by George A. Cooper and starring Godfrey Tearle, Lillian Hall-Davis and Wyndham Standing. It is a love story spanning two generations. It was made at Southall Studios.

Cast
 Godfrey Tearle - Doctor Martin Summer 
 Lillian Hall-Davis - Dora / Doreen 
 Wyndham Standing - Sir Ormsby Ledger 
 Mary Odette - Loanda 
 Mary Rorke - Mrs. Romney 
 Patrick Waddington - Arthur Noel-Vane 
 May Beamish - Mrs. Summer 
 Minnie Rayner - Martha 
 Forrester Harvey - Amos 
 Donald Walcot - Aulole
 Orlando Martins

References

External links

1926 films
1920s romance films
Films directed by George A. Cooper
Films shot at Southall Studios
British silent feature films
British black-and-white films
British romance films
1920s English-language films
1920s British films